The Bermuda Union of Teachers (BUT) is a trade union representing education workers in Bermuda.

The union was founded in 1919, the first to be established in the country.  Its founders were Edith Crawford, Matilda Crawford, Rufus Stovell and Adele Tucker, who were inspired by the deaths of several colleagues who were struggling financially.

Trade unions were not officially legalised in Bermuda until 1946, and the BUT was the first to register with the government.  In 1964, the union absorbed the Teachers' Association of Bermuda, which represented white teachers.  As a result, the union renamed itself as the Amalgamated Bermuda Union of Teachers, but returned to its original name in 1997.

External links

References

Education trade unions
Trade unions established in 1919
Trade unions in Bermuda